Eugeniusz Tkaczyszyn-Dycki (born 1962) is a Polish poet.

Born in Wólka Krowicka near Lubaczów, he is an author of nine volumes of poems and some texts for the magazine Kresy. He has a sister, Wanda Tkaczyszyn, and a nephew named Matthew Reitmajer living in the US. He is a past winner of the Kazimiera Iłłakowiczówna Award, the Barbara Sadowska Award, Polish-German Days of Literature Award, Gdynia Literary Prize and the Paszport Polityki Award. Critics from Ha!art magazine published a book about him, Jesień już Panie a ja nie mam domu. Czesław Miłosz was among his readers. In 2009, he won Poland's top literary prize Nike Award for his book Piosenka o zależnościach i uzależnieniach ("A Song of Dependencies and Addictions"). In 2020, he became the recipient of the Silesius Poetry Award for lifetime achievements.

Works

Poetry
Each year links to its corresponding "[year] in poetry" article:
 1990: Nenia i inne wiersze, Lublin
 1992: Peregrynarz, Warsaw
 1994: Młodzieniec o wzorowych obyczajach Warsaw
 1997: Liber mortuorum, Lublin
 1999: Kamień pełen pokarmu. Księga wierszy z lat 1987-1999, Kraków
 2000: Przewodnik dla bezdomnych niezależnie od miejsca zamieszkania, Legnica
 2003: Daleko stąd zostawiłem swoje dawne i niedawne ciało, Kraków
 2003: Przyczynek do nauki o nieistnieniu, Legnica
 2005: Dzieje rodzin polskich, Warsaw
 2006: Poezja jako miejsce na ziemi. (1988–2003), Warsaw
 2008: Piosenka o zależnościach i uzależnieniach, (Awarded Nike 2009), Wrocław
 2009: Rzeczywiste i nierzeczywiste staje się jednym ciałem.111 wierszy,

Prose
 Zaplecze Legnica 2002

References

External links
 The page of Eugeniusz Tkaczyszyn-Dycki
 Polish bibliography
 

Polish poets
1962 births
Living people
Nike Award winners